Marina Maslyonko (born 3 July 1982 in Kostanay, Kazakh SSR, Soviet Union) is a Kazakhstani sprinter who specializes in the 400 metres. She represented Kazakhstan at the 2012 Summer Olympics.

Competition record

References 

People from Kostanay
1982 births
Living people
Kazakhstani female sprinters
Olympic athletes of Kazakhstan
Athletes (track and field) at the 2012 Summer Olympics
Kazakhstani people of Russian descent
Athletes (track and field) at the 2006 Asian Games
Athletes (track and field) at the 2010 Asian Games
Athletes (track and field) at the 2014 Asian Games
Asian Games medalists in athletics (track and field)
Asian Games silver medalists for Kazakhstan
Asian Games bronze medalists for Kazakhstan
Medalists at the 2006 Asian Games
Medalists at the 2010 Asian Games
21st-century Kazakhstani women